Huai Kaeo railway station is a railway station located in Sai Huai Kaeo Subdistrict, Ban Mi District, Lop Buri. It is located 165.949 km from Bangkok railway station and is a class 3 railway station. It is on the Northern Line of the State Railway of Thailand. Due to its distant location in relation to other villages in the subdistrict, the station mainly acts as a manned passing loop for trains on the main line.

Train services
 Ordinary 202 Phitsanulok-Bangkok
 Ordinary 207/208 Bangkok-Nakhon Sawan-Bangkok
 Ordinary 209/210 Bangkok-Ban Takhli-Bangkok
 Local 401/402 Lop Buri-Phitsanulok-Lop Buri

References 
 Ichirō, Kakizaki (2010). Ōkoku no tetsuro: tai tetsudō no rekishi. Kyōto: Kyōtodaigakugakujutsushuppankai. 
 Otohiro, Watanabe (2013). Tai kokutetsu yonsenkiro no tabi: shasō fūkei kanzen kiroku. Tōkyō: Bungeisha. 

Railway stations in Thailand